Nabby may refer to:

 Evgeni Nabokov, aka Nabby, a professional ice hockey player
 Abigail Adams Smith, aka Nabby Adams, the daughter of Abigail and John Adams
 Nabby Island, an uninhabited island located within 300 feet of Three Mile Island (Lake Winnipesaukee)